The Enchanted Oaks Building, is a historic commercial building, built in 1927, in Carmel-by-the-Sea, California. The structure is recognized as an important commercial building in the city's Downtown Conservation District Historic Property Survey, and was nominated and submitted to the California Register of Historical Resources on January 29, 2003. The building is occupied by the Silvestri Vineyards.

History

The Enchanted Oaks Building is a one-and-one-half story wood framed Tudor Revival-style commercial building, constructed in 1927, on 7th Avenue between Dolores and San Carlos Streets in Carmel-by-the-Sea, California. The exterior walls are textured cement stucco using false half-timbered construction. The ornately carved boards have diamond and scroll patterns. The ground floor has plate glass display windows. A cloth awning hangs above the main entrance with a wood Dutch door. The upper area has multi-paned windows under a gable roof bay supported by wood brackets. The roof is steep-pitched, cross-gabled with wood shingles. The right side has a wrought iron rail around an open deck. 

The Enchanted Oaks Building qualifies for inclusion in the city's Downtown Conservation District Historic Property Survey, and has been nominated and submitted to the California Register of Historical Resources on January 29, 2003, by Kent L. Seavey. The property is significant under the California Register criterion 3, in architecture, as it represents the design work of Carmel architect Samuel J. Miller and Carmel builder Ernest Bixler.

This Enchanted Oaks property has been the home of several businesses over the years. The earliest retail business was a commercial building for physician and surgeon Charles H. Lowell. Composer Alan Silvestri has a wine tasting room for his Carmel Valley, California Silvestri Vineyards on the ground floor of the building. Several additions and remodeling’s took place over the years. The building was once a garage that was constructed in 1920. It was expanded by Miller in 1927 into a Tudor Revival commercial building built for Mrs. C. S. Lowell. In 1931, Ernest Bixler remolded the first floor façade for Carmel writer and realtor Daisy Bostick. He added the brick paneling in front, the multi-panned windows, and a vertical wood-plank Dutch door. In 1941, Bixler designed and constructed two stucco studio apartments at the rear of the property for Bostick.

Samuel J. Miller
Samuel "Sam" John Miller (1888-1958) was born on February 6, 1888, in Lewiston, Idaho. He married Eleanor Doyle on February 18, 1917, in Alameda, California. They had three children during their marriage. His second marriage was to Nellie A. Miller in Salinas on November 22, 1943.

He learned the carpentry trade in San Francisco where he learned the skills to be a designer and builder. For seven years he was the foreman of the L. H. Sly Co., constructing ten large apartment buildings, including the Stanford Court Apartments. He worked in Oakland, California for a period of time. He came to Carmel in ca. 1920 as foreman of construction for master builder M. J. Murphy. He supervised the building of the Blue Bird Tea Room on Ocean Avenue as well as other homes in Carmel, including the Carmel Highlands, and Pebble Beach, California. In the mid 1920s, he established his own office and built over twenty private homes. He did the additions to the Thomas Cator house at 4th Avenue and Lopez Street, and a six-room plastered house for Mrs. C. L. Lowell at 11th Avenue and Scenic Drive in 1925. He lived in Carmel for 24 years before moving to Seaside in 1946.

Miller died of a heart attack on April 26, 1958, in Monterey, California, at the age of 70. Funeral services were held in St. Xavier Church in Seaside, California. Burial was in Mission Memorial Park in Seaside.

Ernest Bixler

Ernest Samuel Bixler (1898-1978), was born on April 1898 in Eureka Springs, Arkansas. His father was Harrison Edward Bixler Sr. (1866-1964) and his mother was Lura Edna Quick (1866-1953). He had two brothers and three sisters. He was married to Ruth Goddard (1900-1987) August 20, 1924 in San Joaquin, California.

Bixler came to California from Arkansas prior to World War I. In 1918, he enlisted and served for the United States Army. When he returned home, he joined his father and became a carpenter in Oakland, California. He worked in the East Bay before coming to the Carmel in 1928. During the Great Depression in the United States, Bixler worked as a carpenter for $4 to $6 dollars a day.

In 1936, Bixler built a large two-story wood-framed and Carmel-stone veneer Tudor-style house for Dr. T. J. Brennan. It is at the northeast corner of 26097 Scenic Road and Martin Way, overlooking Carmel Point and Carmel Bay in Carmel-by-the-Sea, California.

He contributed to designing and building homes in Carmel and Pebble Beach, California until 1939, when he became Carmel's Postmaster. He was postmaster from 1939 to 1951. He held a seat on the Carmel Planning Commission from 1956 to 1952.

In 1951, he returned to contracting until his retirement in 1966. By 1965, in his 35-year career, he had built more than 80 homes in Carmel.

He died on June 16, 1978, at his home in Carmel-by-the-Sea, California, at the age of 80. He was a Monterey Peninsula resident for over 50 years. He was buried at Chapel of the Chimes Columbarium and Mausoleum in Oakland, California.

See also
List of Historic Buildings in Carmel-by-the-Sea

References

External links

 Downtown Conservation District Historic Property Survey

1906 establishments in California
Carmel-by-the-Sea, California
Buildings and structures in Monterey County, California
History of the Monterey Bay Area